Saskatoon Buena Vista was a constituency of the Legislative Assembly of Saskatchewan. Long serving New Democratic Party MLA Herman Rolfes represented the district throughout its entire existence from 1975 to 1982.

Geography 
The seat was named after the residential neighborhood of Buena Vista.

Representation 

 Herman Rolfes (1975–1982)

References 

Former provincial electoral districts of Saskatchewan
Saskatoon